The South Virgin Mountains are a smaller mountain range of the eastern Mojave Desert, in Clark County, southeastern Nevada.

They are located south of the larger Virgin Mountains range, east of the Virgin River leg of Lake Mead, and west of the Arizona Strip.

The South Virgin Mountains are within the jurisdiction of the BLM—Bureau of Land Management.

Mountains 

See also
Virgin Mountains
Lake Mead National Recreation Area
Virgin River Gorge
Virgin River Narrows

References 

Mountain ranges of Nevada
Mountain ranges of the Mojave Desert
Mountain ranges of Clark County, Nevada
Bureau of Land Management areas in Nevada